Lipomelia is a monotypic moth genus in the family Geometridae. It contains only one species, Lipomelia subusta, which is found in India and Taiwan. Both the genus and species were first described by William Warren in 1893.

References

External links

Scopulini
Moths described in 1893
Monotypic moth genera